Ronk or Van Ronk is a surname. Notable people with the surname include:

Dave Van Ronk (1936–2002), American folk singer
Martha Ronk (born 1940), American poet
Sally Ronk (1912–1986), American economist

See also
Rank (surname)
Ronkonkoma (disambiguation)